The Afghanistan national cricket team toured Zimbabwe from 13 July to 5 August 2014, playing four ODIs and two first-class matches against the Zimbabwean team. The tour was originally scheduled for January 2014 but as a result of player strikes in Zimbabwe it was postponed until later in the year.

Squads

Tour matches

List A: Zimbabwe A v Afghans

List A: Zimbabwe A v Afghans

ODI series

1st ODI

2nd ODI

3rd ODI

4th ODI

First-class series

First FC

Second FC

References

External links
 Series at Cricinfo
 Stanikzai returns for Zimbabwe tour

2014 in Afghan cricket
2014 in Zimbabwean cricket
Afghan cricket tours of Zimbabwe
International cricket competitions in 2014
Zimbabwean cricket seasons from 2000–01